Lionel Jay Stander (January 11, 1908 – November 30, 1994) was an American actor in films, radio, theater and television. He is best remembered for his role as majordomo Max on the 1980s mystery television series Hart to Hart.

Early life
Lionel Stander was born in The Bronx, New York City, to Russian-Jewish immigrants, the eldest of three children.

During his one year at the University of North Carolina at Chapel Hill, he appeared in the student productions The Muse of the Unpublished Writer, and  The Muse and the Movies: A Comedy of Greenwich Village.

Career
Stander's acting career began in 1928, as Cop and First Fairy in Him by E. E. Cummings, at the Provincetown Playhouse. He claimed that he got the roles because one of them required shooting craps, which he did well, and a friend in the company volunteered him. He appeared in a series of short-lived plays through the early 1930s, including The House Beautiful, which Dorothy Parker famously derided as "the play lousy".

Early film roles
In 1932, Stander landed his first credited film role in the Warner-Vitaphone short feature In the Dough (1932), with Fatty Arbuckle and Shemp Howard. He made several other shorts, the last being The Old Grey Mayor (1935) with Bob Hope in 1935. That same year, he was cast in a feature, Ben Hecht's The Scoundrel (1935), with Noël Coward. He moved to Hollywood and signed a contract with Columbia Pictures. Stander was in a string of films over the next three years, appearing most notably in Frank Capra's Mr. Deeds Goes to Town (1936) with Gary Cooper, Meet Nero Wolfe (1936) playing Archie Goodwin, The League of Frightened Men (1937), and A Star Is Born (1937) with Janet Gaynor and Fredric March.

Radio roles
Stander's distinctive rumbling voice, tough-guy demeanor, and talent with accents made him a popular radio actor. In the 1930s and 1940s, he was on The Eddie Cantor Show, Bing Crosby's KMH show, the Lux Radio Theater production of A Star Is Born, The Fred Allen Show, the Mayor of the Town series with Lionel Barrymore and Agnes Moorehead, Kraft Music Hall on NBC, Stage Door Canteen on CBS, the Lincoln Highway Radio Show on NBC, and The Jack Paar Show, among others.

In 1941, he starred in a short-lived radio show called The Life of Riley on CBS (no relation to the radio, film, and television character later made famous by William Bendix). Stander played the role of Spider Schultz in both Harold Lloyd's film The Milky Way (1936) and its remake ten years later, The Kid from Brooklyn (1946), starring Danny Kaye. He was a regular on Danny Kaye's zany comedy-variety radio show on CBS (1946–1947), playing himself as "just the elevator operator" amidst the antics of Kaye, future Our Miss Brooks star Eve Arden, and bandleader Harry James.

Also during the 1940s, he played several characters on The Woody Woodpecker and Andy Panda animated theatrical shorts, produced by Walter Lantz Productions. For Woody Woodpecker, he provided the voice of Buzz Buzzard, but was blacklisted from the Lantz studio in 1951 and was replaced by Dal McKennon.

Activism
Stander espoused a variety of social and political causes, and was a founding member of the Screen Actors Guild. At a SAG meeting held during a 1937 studio technicians' strike, he told the assemblage of 2000 members: "With the eyes of the whole world on this meeting, will it not give the Guild a black eye if its members continue to cross picket lines?" (The NY Times reported: "Cheers mingled with boos greeted the question.")  Stander also supported the Conference of Studio Unions in its fight against the Mob-influenced International Alliance of Theatrical Stage Employees (IATSE). Also in 1937, Ivan F. Cox, a deposed officer of the San Francisco longshoremen's union, sued Stander and a host of others, including union leader Harry Bridges, actors Fredric March, Franchot Tone, Mary Astor, James Cagney, Jean Muir, and director William Dieterle. The charge, according to Time magazine, was "conspiring to propagate Communism on the Pacific Coast, causing Mr. Cox to lose his job".

In 1938, Columbia Pictures head Harry Cohn allegedly called Stander "a Red son of a bitch" and threatened a US$100,000 fine against any studio that renewed his contract. Despite critical acclaim for his performances, Stander's film work dropped off drastically. After appearing in 15 films in 1935 and 1936, he was in only six in 1937 and 1938. This was followed by just six films from 1939 through 1943, none made by major studios, the most notable being Guadalcanal Diary (1943).

Stander and HUAC

Stander was among the first group of Hollywood actors to be subpoenaed before the House Un-American Activities Committee (HUAC) in 1940 for supposed Communist activities. At a grand jury hearing in Los Angeles in August 1940—the transcript of which was shortly released to the press—John R. Leech, the self-described former "chief functionary" of the Communist Party in Los Angeles, named Stander as a CP member, along with more than 15 other Hollywood notables, including Franchot Tone, Humphrey Bogart, James Cagney, Clifford Odets and Budd Schulberg. Stander subsequently forced himself into the grand jury hearing, and the district attorney cleared him of the allegations.

Stander appeared in few films in 1944 and 1945. Then, with HUAC's attentions focused elsewhere due to World War II, he played in a number of mostly second-rate pictures from independent studios through the late 1940s. These include Ben Hecht's Specter of the Rose (1946); the Preston Sturges comedy The Sin of Harold Diddlebock (1947) with Harold Lloyd; and Trouble Makers (1948) with The Bowery Boys. One classic emerged from this period of his career, the Preston Sturges comedy Unfaithfully Yours (1948) with Rex Harrison.

In 1947, HUAC turned its attention once again to Hollywood. That October, Howard Rushmore, who had belonged to the CPUSA in the 1930s and written film reviews for the Daily Worker, testified that writer John Howard Lawson, whom he named as a Communist, had "referred to Lionel Stander as a perfect example of how a Communist should not act in Hollywood." Stander was again blacklisted from films, though he played on TV, radio, and in the theater.

In March 1951, actor Larry Parks, after pleading with HUAC investigators not to force him to "crawl through the mud" as an informer, named several people as Communists in a "closed-door session", which made the newspapers two days later. He testified that he knew Stander, but did not recall attending any CP meetings with him.

At a HUAC hearing in April 1951, actor Marc Lawrence named Stander as a member of his Hollywood Communist "cell", along with screenwriter Lester Cole and screenwriter Gordon Kahn. Lawrence testified that Stander "was the guy who introduced me to the party line", and that Stander said that by joining the CP, he would "get to know the dames more" — which Lawrence, who did not enjoy film-star looks, thought a good idea. Upon hearing of this, Stander shot off a telegram to HUAC chair John S. Wood, calling Lawrence's testimony that he was a Communist "ridiculous" and asking to appear before the Committee, so he could swear to that under oath. The telegram concluded: "I respectfully request an opportunity to appear before you at your earliest possible convenience. Be assured of my cooperation." Two days later, Stander sued Lawrence for $500,000 for slander. Lawrence left the country ("fled", according to Stander) for Europe.

After that, Stander was blacklisted from TV and radio. He continued to act in theater roles, and played Ludlow Lowell in the 1952-53 revival of Pal Joey on Broadway and on tour.

Blacklisting
Two years passed before Stander was issued the requested subpoena. Finally, in May 1953, he testified at a HUAC hearing in New York, where he made front-page headlines nationwide by being uproariously uncooperative, memorialized in the Eric Bentley play, Are You Now or Have You Ever Been. The New York Times headline was "Stander Lectures House Red Inquiry." In a dig at bandleader Artie Shaw, who had tearfully claimed in a Committee hearing that he had been "duped" by the Communist Party, Stander testified, "I am not a dupe, or a dope, or a moe, or a schmoe... I was absolutely conscious of what I was doing, and I am not ashamed of anything I said in public or private." An excerpt from that statement was engraved in stone for "The First Amendment Blacklist Memorial" by Jenny Holzer at the University of Southern California.

Other notable statements during Stander's 1953 HUAC testimony:
 "[Testifying before HUAC] is like the Spanish Inquisition. You may not be burned, but you can't help coming away a little singed."
 "I don't know about the overthrow of the government. This committee has been investigating 15 years so far, and hasn't found one act of violence."
 "I know of a group of fanatics who are desperately trying to undermine the Constitution of the United States by depriving artists and others of life, liberty, and the pursuit of happiness without due process of law... I can tell names and cite instances and I am one of the first victims of it. And if you are interested in that and also a group of ex-fascists and America-Firsters and anti-Semites, people who hate everybody including Negroes, minority groups and most likely themselves... and these people are engaged in a conspiracy outside all the legal processes to undermine the very fundamental American concepts upon which our entire system of democracy exists."
 "...I don't want to be responsible for a whole stable of informers, stool pigeons, and psychopaths and ex-political heretics, who come in here beating their breast and say, 'I am awfully sorry; I didn't know what I was doing. Please--I want absolution; get me back into pictures.'"
 "My estimation of this committee is that this committee arrogates judicial and punitive powers which it does not possess."

Stander also denied having been a Communist "now or yesterday." But when asked if he had ever been a party member, he refused to answer, calling it "a trick question."

Stander was blacklisted from the late 1940s until 1965; perhaps the longest period.

Career in independent films in Europe
After that, Stander's acting career went into a free fall. He worked as a stockbroker on Wall Street, a journeyman stage actor, a corporate spokesman—even a New Orleans Mardi Gras king. He didn't return to Broadway until 1961 (and then only briefly in a flop) and to film in 1963, in the low-budget The Moving Finger (although he did provide, uncredited, the voice-over narration for the 1961 film noir Blast of Silence.)

Life improved for Stander when he moved to London in 1964 to act in Bertolt Brecht's Saint Joan of the Stockyards, directed by Tony Richardson, for whom he'd acted on Broadway, along with Christopher Plummer, in a 1963 production of Brecht's The Resistible Rise of Arturo Ui. In 1965, he was featured in the film Promise Her Anything. That same year Richardson cast him in the black comedy about the funeral industry, The Loved One, based on the novel by Evelyn Waugh, with an all-star cast including Jonathan Winters, Robert Morse, Liberace, Rod Steiger, Paul Williams and many others. In 1966, Roman Polanski cast Stander in his only starring role, as the thug Dickie in Cul-de-sac, opposite Françoise Dorléac and Donald Pleasence.

Stander stayed in Europe and eventually settled in Rome, where he appeared in many spaghetti Westerns, most notably playing a bartender named Max in Sergio Leone's Once Upon a Time in the West. He played the role of the villainous mob boss in Fernando Di Leo's 1972 poliziottescho thriller Caliber 9. In Rome he connected with Robert Wagner, who cast him in an episode of It Takes a Thief that was shot there. Stander's few English-language films in the 1970s include The Gang That Couldn't Shoot Straight with Robert De Niro and Jerry Orbach, Steven Spielberg's 1941, and Martin Scorsese's New York, New York, which also starred De Niro and Liza Minnelli.

Stander played a supporting role in the TV film Revenge Is My Destiny with Chris Robinson. He played a lounge comic modeled after the real-life Las Vegas comic Joe E. Lewis, who used to begin his act by announcing "Post Time" as he sipped his ever-present drink.

Hart to Hart and other roles
After 15 years abroad, Stander moved back to the U.S. for the role he is now most famous for: Max, the loyal butler, cook, and chauffeur to the wealthy, amateur detectives Jonathan and Jennifer Hart played by Robert Wagner and Stefanie Powers on the 1979–1984 television series Hart to Hart (and a subsequent series of Hart to Hart made-for-television films). In 1982, Stander won a Golden Globe Award for Best Supporting Actor – Series, Miniseries or Television Film.

In 1986, he became the voice of Kup in The Transformers: The Movie. In 1991 he was a guest star in the television series Dream On, playing Uncle Pat in the episode "Toby or Not Toby". His final theatrical film role was as a dying hospital patient in The Last Good Time (1994), with Armin Mueller-Stahl and Olivia d'Abo, directed by Bob Balaban.

Personal life
Stander was married six times; Lucy Dietz (1928–1936), Alice Twitchell (1938–1942), Vehanne Monteagle (1945–1950), Diana Radbec (1953–1963), Maria Penn (1963–1967) and Stephanie Van Hennick (1971–1994). All ended in divorce except the last marriage, which ended with his death. He fathered six daughters.

Stander died of lung cancer in Los Angeles, California, in 1994 at age 86. He was buried in Glendale's Forest Lawn Memorial Park Cemetery.

Filmography

Radio appearances

References

External links

Lionel Stander: A Hollywood Story
LIONEL STANDER: He Wasn't Afraid of John Wayne…Or Anyone Else
Lionel Stander portrait as a young man NY Public Library Billy Rose collection

1908 births
1994 deaths
20th-century American male actors
American expatriates in Italy
American male film actors
American male radio actors
American male stage actors
American male television actors
American male voice actors
American people of Russian-Jewish descent
Best Supporting Actor Golden Globe (television) winners
Burials at Forest Lawn Memorial Park (Glendale)
Deaths from lung cancer in California
Hollywood blacklist
Jewish American male actors
Male Spaghetti Western actors
People from the Bronx
Walter Lantz Productions people